MTGF may refer to:

Man That Gravity Forgot
Micro Tech Global Foundation